The Doomsday Flight is a 1966 television-thriller film written by Rod Serling and directed by William Graham. The cast includes Jack Lord, Edmond O'Brien, Van Johnson, Katherine Crawford, John Saxon, Richard Carlson and Ed Asner.

The film concerns a bomb placed on an airliner, and the efforts to locate it before it explodes. The terrorist who placed the bomb demands money in exchange for necessary information. The film inspired real-life copycat incidents involving bomb threats.

Plot
At Los Angeles International Airport, a Douglas DC-8 airliner takes off for New York. Shortly after takeoff, the airline receives a bomb threat.  The stranger (Edmond O'Brien) on the telephone asks for a sum of $100,000 in small denominations. He also states that the bomb is hidden in the cabin. The stranger is actually a former engineer who worked in the aviation industry.

The company Chief Pilot Bob Shea (Richard Carlson) decides to warn the flight crew. He orders pilot Capt. Anderson (Van Johnson), to circle around Las Vegas. He also asks the flight crew to search for the bomb on board. It is revealed that the bomb has an aneroid, altitude-sensitive switch and will detonate if the aircraft lands.

Meanwhile, the search to find the bomb on board the flight involves the opening of passenger hand luggage and tearing open several areas in the cabin and cockpit. All efforts are unsuccessful. The passengers are alerted to the emergency and start to panic.

The bomb threat caller telephones again to tell the police how to pay the ransom. A delivery man will simply come to the airport and take the money. The police follow the van closely, but the van has a serious accident on a ring road and catches fire. The terrorist has trouble believing the police who confirm that they are preparing a second payment. He seeks refuge at a bar, where he drinks a lot and starts talking to the bartender (Malachi Throne) who is suspicious of the caller.

When the caller has a heart attack, the bartender calls the police who come running, but the man is dead. The FBI Special Agent Frank Thompson (Jack Lord) then interrogates the bartender asking him to report the exact words of the terrorist. The police discover that the bomb will explode if the airliner drops below 4,000 feet.

The chief pilot then decides to tell the flight crew to land the aircraft at Stapleton International Airport in Denver, Colorado, whose altitude is higher, and landing there will not trigger the bomb. After the airliner is safely on the ground, the flight crew meet in the airline operations room of his company.

In the end, by chance, the bomb is discovered where it was least expected — in the pilot's chart case.

Cast
 Jack Lord as FBI Special Agent Frank Thompson
 Edmond O'Brien as The Man, Bomb Threat Caller
 Van Johnson as Captain Anderson, Pilot
 Katherine Crawford as Jean
 John Saxon as George Ducette, a celebrity on flight
 Richard Carlson as Chief Pilot Bob Shea
 Edward Faulkner as Co-Pilot Reilly
 Tom Simcox as Flight Engineer
 Michael Sarrazin as Army Corporal with PTSD
 Edward Asner as Mr. Feldman
 Malachi Throne as The Bartender
 Jan Shepard as Mrs. Elizabeth Thompson
 Greg Morris as FBI Agent Balaban
 David Lewis as Mr. Rierdon, Personnel Director, Aviation Co.
 Howard Caine as Mack, L.A. Dispatcher

Production
It was the first TV movie for John Saxon.

Release
The Doomsday Flight premiered on NBC in the United States on December 13, 1966 and was the most watched made-for-TV movie to that time, with a Nielsen rating of 27.5 and an audience share of 48% until it was surpassed by Heidi in 1968.

The Doomsday Flight was released theatrically in cinemas in other countries around the world, and distributed by the Rank Organisation in the UK.

Reception
In a contemporary review by J. Gould in The New York Times decried the "exploitation of bomb scares on passenger airplanes" engendered by The Doomsday Flight.

Copycats and FAA concerns
The Doomsday Flight led to copycats who would call airlines and claim to have a similar bomb aboard a flight. A notable attempt was the Qantas bomb hoax in 1971, when a caller claimed to have placed such a bomb. The man actually placed a bomb at the Sydney Airport, leading officials to take the threat seriously and pay out $560,000 to the person. In 1971 the Federal Aviation Administration urged television stations in the United States not to air the film, on the basis that the film could inspire other emotionally unstable individuals to commit the same or similar acts as the villain in the film.

See also
Aircraft hijacking
Disaster film

References

Notes

Citations

Bibliography

 Paris, Michael. From the Wright Brothers to Top Gun: Aviation, Nationalism, and Popular Cinema. Manchester, UK: Manchester University Press, 1995. .
 Pendo, Stephen. Aviation in the Cinema. Lanham, Maryland: Scarecrow Press, 1985. .

External links
 
 

1960s disaster films
1960s thriller films
American aviation films
American television films
Films with screenplays by Rod Serling
Films directed by William Graham (director)
Films scored by Lalo Schifrin
1966 television films
1966 films
1966 in American television
Films set in Los Angeles
Films about aviation accidents or incidents
Films about terrorism in the United States
Films set in Colorado
1960s English-language films
1960s American films